This is a list of fossiliferous stratigraphic units in the Falkland Islands.



List of fossiliferous stratigraphic units

See also 
 List of fossiliferous stratigraphic units in Antarctica

References

Further reading 
 S. Archangelsky and R. Cuneo. 1984. Zonacion del Permico continental de Argentina sobre la base de sus plantas fosiles. Memoria III Congreso Latinoamericano Paleontologia 143-158
 T. G. Halle. 1911. On the geological structure and history of the Falkland Islands. Bulletin of the Geological Institute of the University Uppsala 11:115-229
 M. G. Simões, F. Quaglio, L. V. Warren, L. E. Anelli, P. Stone, C. Riccomini, C. H. Grohmann and M. A. C. Chamani. 2012. Permian non-marine bivalves of the Falkland Islands and their palaeoenvironmental significance. Alcheringa 36:543-554
 P. Stone, M. R. A. Thomson, and A. W. A. Rushton. 2011. An Early Cambrian archaeocyath-trilobite fauna in limestone erratics from the Upper Carboniferous Fitzroy Tillite Formation, Falkland Islands. Transactions of the Royal Society of Edinburgh 102:201-225

.Falkland
Geology of the Falkland Islands
Falkland Islands-related lists
Falkland Islands Fossil